Bhopal Junction railway station (station code: BPL) is a major railway junction of India and main railway station of Bhopal, the capital of the central Indian state of Madhya Pradesh.

Infrastructure

The station has 6 platforms in addition to enough waiting halls, refreshment centre, passenger ticket counter and ticket vending machines, vehicle parking, communication facility, sanitary facility and dedicated Government Railway Police force to ensure security.

History
The station was constructed in year 1910. The second station for the city (Rani Kamalapati) was constructed in year 1975 and its inauguration was done by Indira Gandhi, the then Prime Minister of India.

In 1984, the station was affected in Bhopal disaster, when toxic gas fumes from a nearby chemical plant leaked. In the station, staff, passengers, people fleeing the gases and other persons present died and were injured from inhaling these gases. Station staff still tried to alarm nearby stations not to send trains towards Bhopal. The station master made a stationary train, the Gorakhpur to Mumbai Express, leave immediately ahead of departure time to save the people on board.

The main railway station as well as Rani Kamalapati are selected along with 47 other railway stations to emerge as The World Class Railway Station. The Bhopal Junction and Rani Kamalapati have already received ISO 9001:2000 Certificate.

Services
Bhopal Junction railway station is located on the main Delhi–Chennai route which halts more than 200 daily trains, with a total of more than 380 trains within a week.

Development

The Bhopal railway station has become the India's first railway station to have a sanitary napkin vending machine named as ‘Happy Nari’. The machine dispenses two sanitary napkins at the cost of ₹5 only and accepts ₹5 coins. The sanitary pads vending machine has been installed at platform No.1 by the Railway Women Welfare Association of Bhopal. The machine has the capacity of holding 75 sanitary pads. A specially trained female staff will refill the machine.

See also
Sant Hirdaram Nagar railway station
Rani kamlapati railway station
Nishatpura railway station
List of railway stations in India

References

External links

Railway stations in Bhopal
Railway junction stations in Madhya Pradesh
Railway stations opened in 1910
Bhopal railway division